Adolphus Demetrius DuBose (March 23, 1971 – July 24, 1999) was an American football linebacker in the NFL.

Playing career
DuBose attended the University of Notre Dame, where he was a starting linebacker for the Fighting Irish and a co-captain for the team his senior year. He graduated in 3.5 years, double majoring in finance and international business as well as earning All American status. 

Dubose was selected by the Tampa Bay Buccaneers in the second round (34th pick overall) of the 1993 NFL Draft. He was allowed to leave as a free agent and signed with the New York Jets in 1997. He was waived by the Jets only four months later.

Life after football
During the off-season, he visited places such as Australia, New Zealand, and various countries in Europe. He also spent time in Vail, Colorado, tuning in his snowboarding skills.  He worked for one winter for the Mammoth Mountain Ski Patrol. After football, he invested much of his football earnings in business ventures that were not very successful, including a line of sports clothing and a beach volleyball league. Dubose had aspirations of becoming a successful pro beach volleyball player and was on his way to achieving his goal.

Death
DuBose was shot (13 times, 5 in the back) to death by two police officers, Timothy Keating and Robert Wills, in San Diego during a confrontation on July 24, 1999, after mistakenly entering a neighbors' house next door to the vacation rental he was staying at with friends in Pacific Beach. Although police were called, witnesses stated that the confusion had been resolved by the time police arrived on the scene. While detained by police to confirm his identity, he resisted and attempted to flee the scene. Although DuBose was shirtless and unarmed, police contended they had no choice but to protect themselves and others when the fatal shots were fired. DuBose was shot thirteen times, five in the back, by the two officers with their 9 mm handguns. The toxicology reports showed that he had traces of alcohol, cocaine and ecstasy in his system. He was 28.

The FBI and U.S. Attorney for the Southern District of California investigated the shooting and found that it was justified.  The entire report has been posted on the web. In May 2000, "[t]he Citizens Review Board on Police Practices concluded that while the shooting was a justified use of deadly force under the department's guidelines, the two officers 'did not exercise sufficient discretion.'"  In February 2003, a ten-person federal jury in a wrongful death suit found the officers to be not liable. His grave is located at Evergreen-Washelli Memorial Park in Seattle, Washington. As of August 2020, a documentary film is in production about DuBose.

References

External links

1971 births
1999 deaths
Players of American football from Seattle
American football linebackers
Notre Dame Fighting Irish football players
Tampa Bay Buccaneers players
New York Jets players
Deaths by firearm in California
African Americans shot dead by law enforcement officers in the United States